During the 1984–85 English football season, Everton F.C. competed in the Football League First Division and finished as champions for the first time in 15 years, also winning the European Cup Winners' Cup.

Season summary
Everton enjoyed a hugely successful season, winning the First Division with 90 points (13 more than runners-up Liverpool) and the Cup Winners' Cup with a 3–1 win over Rapid Vienna. In recognition of these achievements, Howard Kendall was voted Manager of the Year while goalkeeper Neville Southall and midfielder Peter Reid picked up the FWA Footballer of the Year and PFA Players' Player of the Year awards respectively. Domestically, the only downside to the season was the FA Cup Final defeat to Manchester United which prevented Kendall's team from completing a domestic double and continental treble. Further disappointment would follow when UEFA's blanket ban on English clubs following the Heysel stadium disaster denied Everton the opportunity to compete in the following season's European Cup.

Everton had ended the 1983–84 campaign by beating Watford 2–0 in the FA Cup final to claim their first piece of silverware for 14 years. Kendall saw little need to make major alterations to his squad although midfielder Paul Bracewell was a notable acquisition, signed for £425,000 from Sunderland, and another was made a few weeks into the new season when Everton paid Birmingham City £100,000 for Pat Van Den Hauwe who quickly made the left-back spot his own. Southall was by now established as first-choice goalkeeper with the defence augmented by right-back Gary Stevens and the centre-back pairing of Derek Mountfield and skipper Kevin Ratcliffe. Reid and Bracewell were flanked in midfield by Trevor Steven and Kevin Sheedy while Graeme Sharp and Andy Gray ended the season as the regular forward line after a serious knee injury suffered against Sheffield Wednesday ended Adrian Heath's season prematurely.

Although the season opened with victory over Liverpool in the Charity Shield, Everton's league campaign began poorly with a 4–1 thrashing by Tottenham Hotspur at Goodison Park followed two days later by a 2–1 defeat at West Bromwich Albion. However, a Kevin Richardson goal gave them victory at Chelsea on the last day of August and they went through September unbeaten, notching up further away wins at Newcastle United and Watford, although three home matches produced only a narrow win over Coventry City and two draws.

October began with defeat at Arsenal but Everton then found their best form with successive victories over Aston Villa, Liverpool and Manchester United. Sharp's wonder goal clinched their first win at Anfield since the 1969-70 championship season and they were arguably even more impressive in beating Ron Atkinson's United the following week. Sheedy (twice), Heath, Stevens and Sharp scored in a 5–0 win that in no way flattered Everton. As if to prove a point, they went to Old Trafford three days later and beat United again, this time in the third round of the Milk Cup.

A 3–0 win over Leicester City saw Everton go top of the league and further victories over West Ham United and Stoke City cemented their position. However, a shock home defeat by Grimsby Town in the Milk Cup triggered a dip in form that saw Everton win only once in six matches and a 4–3 defeat by Chelsea at Goodison just before Christmas saw them surrender the leadership to Tottenham.

Thereafter, Everton were virtually unstoppable. A 2–1 win at Sunderland on Boxing Day began an unbeaten run of 28 matches which saw them collect 50 out of a possible 54 league points and reach two cup finals along the way. They reclaimed top spot in January by beating Newcastle 4–0 and victory at Tottenham at the start of April opened up a four-point lead with games in hand on their closest challengers. A 2–0 win over Queens Park Rangers on 6 May secured the title with five league matches still to play.

The Cup Winners' Cup campaign began with a surprisingly tight aggregate win over University College Dublin but Everton breezed past Inter Bratislava and Fortuna Sittard to set up a semi-final against Bayern Munich. After a goalless first leg in West Germany, they fell behind to a Dieter Hoeness goal at Goodison but roared back to reach the final thanks to goals from Sharp, Gray and Steven. Rapid Vienna were no match in Rotterdam's Feyenoord Stadium and goals from Gray, Steven and Sheedy clinched Everton's first ever European trophy.

In the FA Cup, Everton beat Leeds United, Doncaster Rovers and non-league Telford United without too much difficulty but needed a late Mountfield equaliser in the quarter-final to take Ipswich Town to a replay which they won courtesy of a Sharp penalty. In the semi-final against Luton Town, they were again trailing with time running out when Sheedy equalised with a free kick, and Mountfield headed the winner near the end of extra time.

Ultimately, the final against Manchester United - played just three days after the Cup Winners' Cup final - proved a match too far and Everton went down to a single Norman Whiteside goal in extra time. It could not take the shine off what is regarded by many as the greatest season ever in the history of the club.

Squad

Transfers

In
 Paul Bracewell - Sunderland, £425,000, May 1984
 Pat Van Den Hauwe - Birmingham City, £100,000, September 1984
 Ian Atkins - Sunderland, £100,000, November 1984
 Paul Wilkinson - Grimsby Town, £250,000, March 1985

Out
 Mark Higgins - retired, May 1984
 Ian Bishop - Carlisle United, October 1984
 Alan Irvine - Crystal Palace, October 1984
 Andy King - Wolverhampton Wanderers, January 1985
 Ian Macowat - Gillingham, January 1985
 Stuart Rimmer - Chester City, January 1985

Results

Charity Shield

First Division

Pld = Matches played; W = Matches won; D = Matches drawn; L = Matches lost; GF = Goals for; GA = Goals against; GD = Goal difference; Pts = Points

European Cup Winners' Cup

League Cup

FA Cup

References

Everton
Everton
English football championship-winning seasons
UEFA Cup Winners' Cup-winning seasons